This is a list of Welsh-speaking politicians.

References

 
W